The 1930 French Championships (now known as the French Open) was a tennis tournament that took place on the outdoor clay ourts at the Stade Roland-Garros in Paris, France. The tournament ran from 24 May until 1 June. It was the 35th staging of the French Championships and the second Grand Slam tournament of the year. Henri Cochet and Helen Wills Moody won the singles titles.

Finals

Men's singles

 Henri Cochet defeated  Bill Tilden  3–6, 8–6, 6–3, 6–1

Women's singles

 Helen Wills Moody defeated  Helen Jacobs  6–2, 6–1

Men's doubles
 Henri Cochet /  Jacques Brugnon defeated  Harry Hopman  /  Jim Willard  6–3, 9–7, 6–3

Women's doubles
 Helen Wills Moody  /  Elizabeth Ryan defeated  Simone Barbier  /  Simonne Mathieu  6–3, 6–1

Mixed doubles
 Cilly Aussem  /  Bill Tilden defeated  Eileen Bennett Whittingstall  /  Henri Cochet  6–4, 6–4

Seniors over 40 singles

 Otto Froitzheim defeated  François Blanchy  6-0, 6-4

References

External links
 French Open official website

French Championships
French Championships (tennis) by year
French Champ
French Championships
French Championships
French Championships